City of London was launched in Newcastle in 1801. She spent most of her brief career sailing as a West Indiaman. A French privateer captured her in January or February 1806.

City of London first appeared in Lloyd's Register (LR) in 1802. 

The Journal de Commerce reported that  had arrived at Saint-Malo on 13 February 1806 with two English prizes, one of 300 tons and one of 400. They were carrying sugar, coffee, rum, logwood, etc. Général Pérignon brought them into Saint-Malo.

Citations

1801 ships
Ships built on the River Tyne
Age of Sail merchant ships of England
Captured ships